Horn Pond is a  water body along the Aberjona River in Woburn, Massachusetts in the United States.  The pond is fed by several brooks and flows out via Horn Pond Brook to the Aberjona River and the Mystic Lakes, eventually reaching the Mystic River and the Atlantic Ocean. It was also traversed by the Middlesex Canal from 1802 to 1860.

Yellow perch were the most common species recorded at Horn Pond in a 1982 survey, with additional species, including: largemouth bass, pumpkinseed, bluegill, killifish, chain pickerel, golden shiner, carp, white sucker, brook trout, yellow bullhead, brown bullhead and black crappie. Trout (primarily rainbows, but also browns 
and brookies) have been stocked in the past, with more fish and trout in the fall.

References

External links
Woburn Conservation Commission
Middlesex Canal Association
Woburn Residents' Environmental Network

Lakes of Middlesex County, Massachusetts
Massachusetts natural resources
Woburn, Massachusetts
Ponds of Massachusetts